Skemman.is (est. 2007) is an online digital library of research publications in Iceland. The National and University Library of Iceland in Reykjavík currently operates the repository. Contributors of content include the Agricultural University of Iceland, Bifröst University, Hólar University College, Iceland Academy of the Arts, National and University Library of Iceland, Reykjavik University, University of Akureyri, and University of Iceland.

See also
 Libraries in Iceland
 Media of Iceland

References

Further reading

External links
 Official site
 
 

2007 establishments in Iceland
Open-access archives
Icelandic digital libraries
Libraries established in 2007